During the 1983–84 English football season, Leicester City F.C. competed in the Football League First Division.

Season summary
In the 1983–84 season, Leicester had a poor start with six successive league defeats which represented the Foxes' worst start to a season and labelled them as early relegation favourites. After going out of the League Cup though, their form picked up with only 2 defeats in their next 15 league games from the end of October until the end of January. Their relegation worries were formally avoided when Leicester beat Nottingham Forest 2-1 at Filbert Street on 5 May with 2 games to spare and the Foxes finished the season in a fairly comfortable 15th place.

Final league table

Results
Leicester City's score comes first

Legend

Football League First Division

FA Cup

League Cup

Squad

References

Leicester City F.C. seasons
Leicester City